Princess Louise d'Orléans (Louise Victoire Marie Amélie Sophie; 19 July 1869 – 4 February 1952) was a French princess of the House of Orléans and a member of the Royal Family of Bavaria. Throughout her life, Louise remained very close to her first cousin, Archduchess Marie Valerie of Austria.

Early life and family
Princess Louise of Orléans was born at Bushy House, Teddington, England in 1869. She was the daughter of the French prince Ferdinand, Duke of Alençon, and his wife Duchess Sophie Charlotte in Bavaria. Louise's mother was a sister of Empress Elisabeth of Austria ("Sisi") and Queen Marie of the Two Sicilies, the heroine of Gaeta. Her paternal grandparents were Prince Louis, Duke of Nemours, the second son of Louis-Philippe I, King of the French; and Princess Victoria of Saxe-Coburg and Gotha, a first cousin of Queen Victoria. Louise had a younger brother, Prince Emmanuel, Duke of Vendôme.

Marriage
On 15 April 1891 at Schloss Nymphenburg, Louise married her second cousin Prince Alfons of Bavaria. He was the second son of Prince Adalbert of Bavaria (1828–1875) and his wife, Amelia de Bourbon (1834–1905).

They had two children:
Prince Joseph Clemens of Bavaria (1902–1990), who never married;
Princess Elisabeth Maria of Bavaria (1913–2005), who married firstly Count Franz Josef von Kageneck (1915–1941), then Ernst Küstner (1920)

In Paris on 4 May 1897, her mother, the famed duchesse d'Alençon, died in a fire at a charity bazaar (the Bazar de la Charité); she had refused rescue attempts, insisting that the girls working with her at the bazaar be saved first.

Louise died in 1952 in Munich.

Ancestry

References

Profile, thePeerage.com; accessed 16 April 2014.

1862 births
1952 deaths
House of Wittelsbach
French princesses
Princesses of France (Orléans)
People from Teddington
Burials at St. Michael's Church, Munich